The Minister of State for Transport is a mid-level ministerial position in the Department for Transport of the Government of the United Kingdom who deputises for the Secretary of State for Transport. There is also a list of Parliamentary Under-Secretary of State for Transport, which is junior to Minister of State.

Ministers of State for Transport

Parliamentary Under-Secretaries of State for Transport
2006–2008: Tom Harris
2008–2009: Paul Clark
2007–2009: Jim Fitzpatrick
2009–2010: Chris Mole
2010–2013: Norman Baker
2013–2015: Robert Goodwill
2010–2012: Mike Penning
2012–2014: Stephen Hammond
2014–2016: Claire Perry
2016–2018: Paul Maynard
2015–2017: Andrew Jones
2015–2017: The Lord Ahmad of Wimbledon
2016–2018: Paul Maynard
2017–2017: The Lord Callanan
2017–2018: Jesse Norman
2017–2019: The Baroness Sugg
2018–2019: Andrew Jones
2018–2020: Nus Ghani
2019–2020: Paul Maynard
2020: Kelly Tolhurst
2019–present: The Baroness Vere of Norbiton
2020–2021: Rachel Maclean
2020–2022: Robert Courts
2021–2022: Trudy Harrison
2021–2022: Wendy Morton
2022: Karl McCartney
2022: Katherine Fletcher
2022–present: Richard Holden

References

Transport
Department for Transport
Transport ministers
1997 establishments in the United Kingdom
2015 disestablishments in the United Kingdom